Preston Capes is a village and civil parish in West Northamptonshire in England. The population at the 2001 census was 188, including Canons Abbey and increasing to 216 at the 2011 census.

The village's name means "Priest Farm/Settlement". The village was owned by Hugo filius Nicholai de Capes in 1234.

The Church of England parish church is dedicated to St Peter and St Paul.

References

External links 

Village website

Villages in Northamptonshire
West Northamptonshire District
Civil parishes in Northamptonshire